Entiat may refer to:
 Entiat (tribe)
 Entiat, Washington
 Lake Entiat, in Washington
 Entiat River, in Washington
 Entiat Mountains, in Washington